John Patrick Underwood (December 8, 1894 – December 31, 1936) was a professional American football player from Hinckley, Minnesota. After attending high school in Duluth, Underwood made his professional debut in the National Football League with the hometown Duluth Kelleys. He played for the Kelleys (later renamed the Duluth Eskimos), Chicago Cardinals, and Pottsville Maroons.

References

1894 births
1936 deaths
American football ends
American football guards
American football tackles
Buffalo Bisons (NFL) players
Chicago Cardinals players
Duluth Eskimos players
Duluth Kelleys players
Pottsville Maroons players
People from Hinckley, Minnesota
Players of American football from Minnesota